Ovenna guineacola is a moth of the  subfamily Arctiinae. It was described by Strand in 1912. It is found in Equatorial Guinea, Ghana, Guinea, Kenya, Nigeria and Uganda.

References

Lithosiini
Moths described in 1912